Tampico Beverages is an American manufacturer of bottled fruit-flavored drinks and gelatin. It is available in the United States and more than 56 countries around the globe. Tampico Beverages is wholly owned by Houchens Industries Inc. since 2008.

History
Founded in 1989, Tampico Beverages began with just one flavor: Citrus Punch.  By the early 1990s, they had secured their first international licensee in Mexico.  The company continued to add flavors and work with licensees to add new package sizes and formats, and, in 2014 its Citrus Gallon had become the number one selling item in the refrigerated drink category in the U.S. Tampico now provides concentrate to licensees in over 50 countries.

Products
As of 2014, Tampico's products were as follows.  In the U.S., these are labeled as a type of soft drink with the word "punch".  The words "fruit" or "juice" do not appear because the bulk consists of water, sugar, and flavoring, with only tiny proportions of fruit juice.

Non-carbonated drinks
Blue Raspberry
Citrus Punch (Original flavor)
Island Punch
Kiwi Strawberry Punch
Lime Punch
Mango Punch
Peach Punch
Pineapple Coconut Punch
Strawberry Banana Punch
Tropical Punch

Carbonated drinks
Apple
Lemon-Lime
Orange
Pineapple
Tamarind

Iced tea
Unsweetened
Sweetened
Lemon
Peach

Gelatin
Citrus Punch
Kiwi Strawberry Punch
Tropical Punch

References

External links
 

1989 establishments in Illinois
American soft drinks
Drink companies of the United States
Brand name desserts
Manufacturing companies based in Chicago
American companies established in 1989
Iced tea brands
Juice brands
Food and drink companies based in Illinois
Food and drink companies established in 1989